
Year 682 (DCLXXXII) was a common year starting on Wednesday (link will display the full calendar) of the Julian calendar. The denomination 682 for this year has been used since the early medieval period, when the Anno Domini calendar era became the prevalent method in Europe for naming years.

Events 
 By place 
 Europe 
 King Erwig of the Visigoths continues oppression of the Jews in Spain. He makes it illegal to practice any Jewish rites (brit milah), and presses for the conversion or emigration of the remaining Jews. 
 Ghislemar becomes mayor of the palace in Neustria and Burgundy, after he deposes his father Waratton. He reverses the peace treaty with Austrasia, signed with Pepin of Herstal at Namur.
 King Ecgfrith requests Benedict Biscop to build a second monastery at Jarrow (Northumbria). Benedict leaves Monkwearmouth with 20 monks, (including his protégé, the young Bede). 
 The West Saxons, led by King Centwine, drive the Britons of Dumnonia (West Country) to the sea (possibly around Bideford). 
 The wandering ex-Wessex sub-king, Cædwalla, seeks St. Wilfrid as his spiritual father, but does not convert to Christianity.
 Bridei III, King of the Picts, campaigns violently against Orkney.

 Africa 
 Muslim forces led by Uqba ibn Nafi overrun the south coast of the Mediterranean Sea. He occupies the cities of Tripoli and Carthage, the last Byzantine bases in Africa (approximate date).

 Asia 
 Due to a culmination of major droughts, floods, locust plagues, and epidemics, a widespread famine breaks out in the dual Chinese capital cities of Chang'an (primary capital) and Luoyang (secondary capital). The scarcity of food drives the price of grain to unprecedented heights, ending a once prosperous era under emperors Tai Zong and Gao Zong on a sad note.
 Emperor Tenmu issues a decree forbidding the Japanese-style cap of ranks and garments, and changing them into Chinese ones. He also makes a decree forbidding men to wear leggings and women to let down their hair on their backs. It is from this time, that the practice begins of women riding on horseback like men. He issues an edict prescribing the character of ceremonies and language to be used on occasions of ceremony. Ceremonial kneeling and crawling are both abolished, and the ceremonial custom of standing at the Tang court is practiced.

 Mesoamerica 
 Jasaw Chan K'awiil I starts to rule in Tikal (modern Guatemala) during the Late Classic period.
 B'alaj Chan K'awiil begins a program to inscribe monuments recording his travails and ultimate victory, during the Second Tikal-Calakmul War.

 By topic 
 Astronomy 
 January 3 – Venus occults Jupiter.

 Literature 
 The first entry is made in the Welsh chronicle Brut y Tywysogion.

 Religion 
 August 17 – Pope Leo II succeeds Agatho as the 80th pope, after a period of sede vacante ("vacant seat") of a year and 7 months.

Births 
 July 20 – Taichō, Japanese Buddhist monk (d. 767) 
 November 2 – Umar II, Muslim caliph (d. 720)
 Li Chongrun, prince of the Tang Dynasty (d. 701)

Deaths 
 Barbatus, bishop of Benevento
 Bilal ibn al-Harith, companion of Muhammad (approximate date)
 Zaynab bint Ali, sister of Husayn ibn Ali (b. 626)
 Bojang, king of Goguryeo (Korea)
 Buyeo Yung, prince of Baekje (in exile in Luoyang)
 Cadwaladr, king of Gwynedd (Wales) 
 Cenn Fáelad mac Colgan, king of Connacht (Ireland)
 Li Jingxuan, chancellor of the Tang Dynasty (b. 615)
 Maslama ibn Mukhallad al-Ansari, companion of Muhammad
 Sun Simiao, Chinese medicine doctor
 Lady K’awiil Ajaw, queen regnant of the Maya city State of Cobá (b. 617)

References 

 

da:680'erne#682